This is an alphabetical list of notable baseball players born in Washington who have played in Major League Baseball.



S

 Adrian Sampson
 Ryne Sandberg
 Blake Snell

References

Players Born in Washington - Baseball-Reference.com

Baseball players from Washington